Allyson Renee Swaby (born 3 October 1996) is an American-born Jamaican professional footballer who plays as a centre back for Paris Saint-Germain, on loan from Angel City FC, and the Jamaica women's national team.

Amateur/College 

Swaby attended and played soccer for Hall High School, Connecticut. She played college soccer for the Boston College Eagles in the United States, for four seasons between 2014 and 2017.

Club career 
Swaby began her first journey into European football in 2018, moving to Icelandic third-division football team Fjarðab/Höttur/Leiknir for a short spell.

Swaby would gain a total of 12 appearances and 5 goals in all competitions during her brief stay in Iceland, before the Jamaican international defender caught the interest of Roma coach Betty Bavagnoli. The Italian club signed Swaby as a late, mid-season arrival to boost their squad in Roma's inaugural season of top-flight Italian football.

During the 2018-19 Serie A season, Swaby soon rose through the ranks from a Roma squad player to a regular first-eleven defender who could play either at centre-back or full-back for her club. She capped off her first season with Roma by appearing in the 2019 World Cup for Jamaica.

In her second season with Roma, Swaby's influence on Roma's backline continued to rise along with the consistency in her performances as she became one of the most regular players in the Roma squad. The club relied on Swaby's consistency to form different defensive partnerships with several names such as Federica Di Criscio, Petronella Ekroth and Tecla Pettenuzzo. Roma recognised Swaby's role in the club's growth by making her one of the first Roma players to sign a multi-year contract with the Giallorosse on March 4, 2020.

During her third season with Roma, Swaby was joined by new January 2021 signing Elena Linari at the heart of Roma's defence. The duo went on to reduce Roma's goals-conceded-per-game rate in the second half of the 2020-21 season. On May 30, 2001, Swaby helped Roma keep a clean sheet and win their first major trophy on the women's side of football when Roma defeated AC Milan on penalties in the Coppa Italia final.

On December 21, 2021, it was announced that Swaby would join National Women's Soccer League expansion side Angel City FC following the completion of the Supercoppa Italiana in January 2022.

On January 26, 2023, Angel City announced that Swaby would be joining Paris Saint-Germain on a six-month loan. On January 30, PSG confirmed the loan until June 2023.

International career 
Swaby began her international career with Jamaica in 2018, making 4 appearances in the CONCACAF Women's Championship and playing in the third/fourth place playoff game against Panama. She played in Jamaica's successful World Cup 2019 qualifying campaign, and played in the World Cup tournament itself in the summer of 2019.

In the summer of 2021, Allyson Swaby started as captain of the Jamaica team for the first time in her international career.

Style of play 
Swaby shows a preference for direct, vertical football and often makes vertical passes straight to the frontline. She is a skilled defender in aerial duels and can often be tasked with man-marking by her team, owing to her athleticism and strength in individual duels.

Personal life
Her younger sister Chantelle Swaby is also a Jamaican international footballer.

References

External links

1996 births
Living people
Citizens of Jamaica through descent
Jamaican women's footballers
Women's association football defenders
A.S. Roma (women) players
Angel City FC players
Paris Saint-Germain Féminine players
Serie A (women's football) players
Division 1 Féminine players
Jamaica women's international footballers
2019 FIFA Women's World Cup players
Jamaican expatriate women's footballers
Jamaican expatriate sportspeople in Iceland
Expatriate women's footballers in Iceland
Jamaican expatriate sportspeople in Italy
Expatriate women's footballers in Italy
Jamaican expatriate sportspeople in France
Expatriate women's footballers in France
People from West Hartford, Connecticut
Sportspeople from Hartford, Connecticut
Soccer players from Connecticut
American women's soccer players
Boston College Eagles women's soccer players
African-American women's soccer players
American sportspeople of Jamaican descent
American expatriate women's soccer players
American expatriate sportspeople in Iceland
American expatriate sportspeople in Italy
American expatriate sportspeople in France
21st-century African-American sportspeople
21st-century African-American women
National Women's Soccer League players